Rahul Easwar is an Indian philosophy author and orator from India.

Personal life
Easwar is the son of Easwaran Namboothiri and Mallika, and grandson of Kandararu Maheshwararu, senior supreme priest of Sabarimala. He is an executive member of Munnokka Samudaya Samrakshana Munnani. He is also the secretary of Hindu Parliament.

He was the winner of Malayalee House, an adaptation of the reality television competition Big Brother. He has given talks at TEDxIIM, TEDxSRM and TEDxNMIMS.

Activism
When Kerala Government decided to give the Raja Ravi Varma Puraskaram award to artist M. F. Husain in 2007, Easwar initiated a campaign against him for alleged anti-Hindu sentiments resulting in the retraction of the award. Easwar has conducted campaigns for tribal rights in Kerala and was arrested along with a thousand members of the Malayaraya Tribal Community.
	
Easwar protested against Travancore Devaswom Board, in favour of letting members of the Malayaraya Scheduled Tribe (ST) community light the makaravilakku light at Sabarimala. He was detained by the police for planning the protest.
 		 		
Easwar defended Mata Amritanandamayi over the controversies related to allegations made by Gail Tredwell. He also congratulated the Travancore Royal Family for victory in the Padmanabha Swamy Temple issue and wishes to free all temples from government control. Easwar articulated the difference between Makara Jyothi and Makara Vilakku, bringing closure to a long-standing controversy. He and MLA P.C George were engaged in legal battle for rights of Malayaraya Tribals who was involved in the 'Makaravilakku' in Sabarimala.

In July 2016, during an interview about mistreatment of temple elephants, Easwar pointed that temples have financial incentives to entertain crowds, which often results in the use of elephants for the spectacle. The root cause of the mistreatment, he believes, is a lack of spiritual education. "Our temples have become carnival spaces and tourist places, devoid of spiritual meaning and content." Easwar recommended as a reform, one-hour Saturday spiritual education for Hindus, similar to Friday for Muslims and Sunday for Christians. He supports the cultivation of "Secular Hindu unity" in Kerala. He went to court against the hate speech by Hindu leader Sadhvi Prachi against Muslim community.

He proposed that "Hindu majority consolidation should not be anti minority and it should be inclusive. He also quoted DGP Siby Mathews, that more than 80% of suicides are among Hindus, as opposed to just 8% Muslims, saying that a well organised religious majority would come to the rescue of these individuals".
 
Easwar was selected as Flag Ambassador of Mahatma Gandhi National Foundation which aims at National integration. He was attacked by a group of left wing students from Milad E Sherif Memorial College for his anti-beef festival & cow protection stance. They attacked and vandalized his car. Easwar received many death threats when he was the guest for Jamat-e-Islami religious harmony function in Kochi. NIA investigation held that ISIS was targeting some Hindu leaders and Muslim organisations in the state, who had condemned the terrorist outfit.

Easwar received threats for visiting Hadiya and Madani. A complaint was filed by K M  Ashokan, whose daughter's marriage was annulled by the High Court over controversy of forcible religious conversion. Easwar released the video of Hadiya saying that her life is in danger and Supreme Court took note of it when it was raised and it later secured her release from captivity. Supreme Court bench headed by Chief Justice also expunged the allegations against Easwar. Easwar welcomed the entry of all believers to Sabarimala temple irrespective of religion. He also supported the priesthood for all beyond caste. Easwar and Thushar Vellappaly, son of Vellapally Natesan demanded an anti forced conversion law in Kerala.

Females of age 10 to 50 are prohibited from entering the Sabarimala temple, because the resident deity, Lord Ayyappā is practising celibacy (Naiṣṭika Brahmacārya). In September 2018, after a 20-year legal challenge, the Supreme Court lifted the ban, against the will of most female Ayyappā devotees. Easwar and his group Ayyappa Dharma Sena (ADS) protested the decision and threatened to have Ayyappa Dharma Sena members cut themselves to spill blood on the temple floor, which would have forced its closure. Easwar became the face of Sabarimala protests and was arrested for inciting and protesting near the temple complex.

Media career

References

External links
 Official website
 IIM A Statement

Activists from Kerala
Living people
Year of birth missing (living people)
Indian Hindus
Indian Hindu spiritual teachers
People from Kerala